Casting Crowns is a contemporary Christian music band from McDonough, Georgia. Consisting of Mark Hall (vocals), Meledee DeVevo (violin), Juan DeVevo (guitars), Hector Cervantes (guitars), Chris Huffman (bass guitar), Megan Garrett (keyboard) and Brian Scoggin (drums), the band has released five studio albums: Casting Crowns (2003), Lifesong (2005), The Altar and the Door (2007), Until the Whole World Hears (2009), and Come to the Well (2011). They have also released four live albums and one holiday album.

Casting Crowns has won and been nominated for numerous awards in the United States. At the 48th Grammy Awards, their album Lifesong won the award for Best Pop/Contemporary Gospel Album, the band's only Grammy Award out of five career nominations. The band was awarded the Dove Award for Group of the Year for five consecutive years from 2005–09, and they were awarded the Dove Award for Artist of the Year in 2010. Their albums Lifesong and The Altar and the Door have both received the Dove Award for Pop/Contemporary Album of the Year, while their songs "Who Am I", "Praise You In This Storm" and "East to West" have been honored with the Dove Award for Pop/Contemporary Recorded Song of the Year.

American Music Awards
The American Music Awards are awarded for achievements in the American record industry. Casting Crowns has been nominated for six awards, winning four of them.

Billboard Music Awards
The Billboard Music Awards reflect "chart rankings based on key fan interactions with music, including album sales and downloads, track downloads, radio airplay and touring as well as streaming and social interactions on Facebook, Twitter, Vevo, YouTube, Spotify and other popular online destinations for music". Casting Crowns has been nominated for five awards, winning two of them.

Dove Awards
The GMA Dove Awards honor artists in the genres of Christian music and Gospel music. Casting Crowns has been nominated for 52 awards, winning 16 of them.

Grammy Awards
The Grammy Awards are awarded annually by The Recording Academy and honor "artistic achievement, technical proficiency and overall excellence in the recording industry, without regard to album sales or chart position". Casting Crowns has received one award out of six nominations.

References

Lists of awards received by American musician
Lists of awards received by musical group